Essgee may be:
Essgee Entertainment an Australian theatrical production company
A tradename used by Siebe Gorman (a British engineering company that developed diving gear)
Ess Gee, a song by Underworld from their album A Hundred Days Off